Leo Portnoff (1875 in Kiev – 1940 in Miami, Florida) was a musician, teacher, and composer. He was a professor at the Stern Conservatory in Berlin from 1906 to 1915. He arrived in the United States in 1922. He initially resided in Brooklyn, and later moved to Florida to teach music at the University of Miami.

Works

 Concertino in e-moll op.13, Viol/Klav (BOE003532)
 Concertino in a-moll op. 14, Viol/Klav (BOE003533)
 Gazelle, Viol/Klav (BOE004645 Special Order Edition)
 Minuet in old style, Viol/Klav (BOE004646 Special Order Edition)
 On the Dnieper, Orchester (BOE006604 Special Order Edition)
 Russian Fantasia No1 in a-moll, Viol/Klav (BOE004565)
 Russian Fantasia No2 in d-moll, Viol/Klav (BOE004566)
 Russian Fantasia No3 in a-moll, Viol/Klav (BOE004564)
 Russian Fantasia No4 in e-moll, Viol/Klav (BOE004517)
 Waving Fields, Viol/Klav (BOE004648 Special Order Edition)

External links 
 

1875 births
1940 deaths
Ukrainian composers